Shel Mi HaShura HaZot? (lit.  Whose Line Is It?) is an Israeli version of the British improvisational comedy TV show Whose Line Is It Anyway?. It aired for four seasons: two seasons from 2000 to 2001 on Channel 2, hosted by Shlomo Baraba; and another two seasons from 2006 to 2007 on Channel 10, hosted by Idan Alterman. The show consisted of a panel of four performers who create scenes on the spot.

Cast
First and second seasons
 Shlomo Baraba (host)
 Dror Keren
 Shira Alon
 Alon Neuman
 Roi Levy
 Sharon Teicher
 Tomer Sharon ("Tomasz")

Third and fourth season
 Idan Alterman (host)
 Tomer Sharon ("Tomasz")
 Shmulik Levy
 Elinor Rock
 Maor Cohen
 Yael Leventhal

See also
 Mishak Makhur

References

External links 

 

Improvisational television series
Israeli game shows
Channel 2 (Israeli TV channel) original programming
2000 Israeli television series debuts
2007 Israeli television series endings
Israeli television series based on British television series